Curtain Call is a South Korean television series starring Kang Ha-neul, Ha Ji-won, Go Doo-shim, Sung Dong-il, Jung Ji-so, Noh Sang-hyun, and Kwon Sang-woo. The series revolves around a man who plays the role of a grandson who defected to fulfill the grandmother's last wish from the North, a woman who falls in love with that man, and the people involved in the play. It premiered on KBS2 on October 31, 2022, and aired every Monday and Tuesday at 21:50 (KST). It is also available for streaming on Amazon Prime Video in selected regions.

Synopsis
During the Korean war, while attempting to escape North Korea, Geum-soon is separated from her husband and infant son. She manages to make it to South Korea where begins her new life, running Nakwon Inn on Korea’s southern coast, while waiting for her lost family. She remarries, has a son and grandchildren and builds the Nakwon Group, the top hotel chain in the country. Years later, at a reunion between separated families, Geum-soon gets a chance to meet her grown-up North Korean son and his son named Ri Moon-sung. But at the next reunion, she is informed about the death of her son, losing any contact with the grandson as well.

In the present day, Geum-soon is dying of cancer and has only three months left. Geum-soon's granddaughter and the manager of the hotel, Park Se-yeon, works hard to protect Nakwon’s name and keep the chain in the family while her elder brother tries to sell it. Meanwhile, Geum-soon's trusted right-hand man, Jeong Sang-cheol who has been searching for her North Korean grandson for years, finally tracks him down only to learn that he has become a smuggler and a violent criminal operating in China. Jeong decides to keep this truth from Geum-soon but comes up with a plan to grant her last wish to meet her grandson again.

Jeong then approaches Yoo Jae-hoon, a struggling actor of an unknown theater company who does several part time jobs to make ends meet, after watching his performance as a North Korean soldier in a play. Jeong asks Yoo to impersonate Geum-soon's North Korean grandson. In exchange for 500 million won, Yoo begins to play that role for three months.

Cast

Main
 Kang Ha-neul as Yoo Jae-heon / Jung-moon
 Yoo Jae-heon: A theater actor in a local theater company. He receives a sudden offer from an old gentleman to play the defecting grandson of a certain grandmother, and he faces a major turning point in his life.
 Jung-moon: Geum-soon's North Korean husband from whom she separated decades ago.
 Ha Ji-won as Park Se-yeon
 Geum-soon's granddaughter. The youngest daughter and the general manager of Hotel Nakwon. She and her brothers lost parents at young age and were raised by their grandmother.
 Go Doo-shim as Ja Geum-soon
 Ha Ji-won as young Geum-soon
 The founder of Hotel Nakwon, a leading hotel chain in Korea. During the Korean War she descends South and is separated from her husband and child. She grows a hotel while waiting for the two of them. She wishes to see her grandson Moon-sung one last time.
 Sung Dong-il as Jeong Sang-cheol
 Dawon as young Jeong Sang-cheol
 The former manager of Hotel Nakwon and right-hand man of Geum-soon. Even after retiring from his managerial position, he looks after and assists Geum-soon.
 Jung Ji-so as Seo Yoon-hee
 A theater actress in Yoo Jae-heon's theater company. She is asked to play the wife's role of the defecting grandson played by Yoo Jae-heon.
 Noh Sang-hyun as Ri Moon-sung
 Geum-soon's North Korean grandson. A smuggler from North Korea and a member of a Korean-Chinese drug organization.
 Kwon Sang-woo as Bae Dong-jae
 Se-yeon’s ex-fiancé. The successor of a giant conglomerate Samwoo who owns a distribution chain.

Supporting

Geum-soon's family
 Ji Seung-hyun as Park Se-jun
 The first grandson and the major shareholder of Hotel Nakwon founded by his grandmother Geum-soon.
 Choi Dae-hoon as Park Se-gyu
 The second grandson of Hotel Nakwon's founder.
 Hwang Woo-seul-hye as Hyun Ji-won
 Park Se-jun's wife who is a former announcer.
 Bae Hae-sun as Yoon Jung-sook
 Park Ji-won as young Yoon Jung-sook
 A housekeeper of Hotel Nakwon for a long time, now serving as Geum-soon's housekeeper.

Others
 Kim Hyun-sook as Hong Ra-kyung
 Manager of Hotel Nakwon who works under Park Se-yeon's direct management. 
 Jung Yoo-jin as Song Hyo-jin 
 Park Se-yeon's close friend and the youngest daughter of a large construction company. 
 Son Jong-hak as Kim Seung-do
 A longtime employee and managing director of Hotel Nakwon.
 Han Jae-Young as Jang Tae-joo 
 A former detective who has been tracking the whereabouts of the real grandson of Geum-soon at the request of Jeong Sang-cheol.

Special appearances
 Ahn Nae-sang as a doctor
 Lee Yi-kyung as Park No-kwang
 A close friend of Yoo Jae-heon.
 Kim Young-min as Ri Young-hoon
 Geum-soon's son who was separated from her during the war when he was a child.
 Choi Jung-won as Song Hyo-jin's acquaintance
 Jang Hye-jin as Oh Ga-young
 Seo Yoon-hee's mother.
 Hong Ki-joon as a Korean-Chinese
 Jung Eui-jae as Mu-jin
 Geum-soon's South Korean husband.
 Baek Jin-hee as Jin-sook
 Wife of Ri Mun-sang.
 Choi Jung-woo as Cheol-jin
 North Korean defector who became a judge.
 Kim Kang-hyun as a reporter
 Lim Sa-rang as Staff of Nakwon Hotel

Production
Early working title of the series was A Tree Dies Standing.
The roles of Park Se-yeon and Geum-soon were first offered to Son Ye-jin and Youn Yuh-jung respectively. In July 2022, it was reported that filming is currently in progress.

The press conference of the drama which was scheduled to be held on October 31, 2022 was canceled due to the aftermath of the Itaewon Halloween crowd crush.

Original soundtrack

Part 1

Part 2

Part 3

Part 4

Part 5

Part 6

Part 7

Part 8

Part 9

Part 10

Viewership

Awards and nominations

Notes

References

External links
  
 
 Curtain Call at Daum 
 
 

Korean-language television shows
Korean Broadcasting System television dramas
2022 South Korean television series debuts
2022 South Korean television series endings
Television series by Victory Contents
South Korean melodrama television series
Works about the Korean War
Works about North Korean defectors